Brit Awards 2018 was the 38th edition of the British Phonographic Industry's annual pop music show, the Brit Awards. It was held on the 21st February 2018 at the O2 Arena in London, with Jack Whitehall as the host. The Brit Award statuette designed by sculptor Sir Anish Kapoor was awarded to the winners. Foo Fighters, Dua Lipa and Ed Sheeran were among the global stars nominated for awards in the ceremony.

Performances
Ariana Grande was scheduled to perform a tribute, in remembrance of those who lost their lives at the Manchester Arena Bombing, but later withdrew due to illness. Liam Gallagher instead, stood in for  Grande, performing "Live Forever".

Pre-ceremony

Main show

Winners and nominees
The nominations were revealed on 13 January 2018.

Multiple nominations and awards

Brit Awards 2018 album

The Brit Awards 2018 is a compilation and box set which has two discs with a total of forty songs.

Track listing

CD 1

CD 2

British Video of the Year controversy

The 2018 ceremony garnered controversy when Harry Styles was announced as the winner of the British Video of the Year. The official Brits leaderboard for these votes showed Little Mix consistently maintaining the number one spot each week, followed by Styles at number two. During the final voting event on the night of the ceremony Little Mix and Styles alternated between the top spot on numerous occasions. The last leader-board update placed Little Mix at the top spot, with Styles at number two. After the announcement of Styles as a winner, the Brit Awards were accused by Little Mix fans of rigging the votes for this category.
The Brits responded to the claim, saying: "The final leader-board was displayed on The BRITs website prior to the final count being checked and verified independently by the Electoral Reform Services, the company that independently run all BRITs voting processes. The leader-board doesn’t work in real time and the vote was incredibly tight at the top. Fans can have complete confidence in the BRITs public vote." The Electoral Reform Services added: "Robust vote-counting rules and filters are in place which are in accordance with ITV's voting regulations, and agreed and tested prior to any vote taking place. We are confident that the vote integrity has not been compromised."

References

External links
Brit Awards 2018 at Brits.co.uk

Brit Awards
Brit Awards
BRIT Awards
Brit

Brit
2018 awards in the United Kingdom